SaRang Community Church is a Presbyterian Church in Seoul, Korea with over 60,000 members.

SaRang, one of several megachurches in Korea, was founded in 1978 by Rev. Oak Han-heum.  At Pastor Oak's death in 2010, the church attracted 40,000 worshipers every Sunday and had 80,000 members.

In 2003 Pastor Oak announced his retirement, eschewing the Korean custom of passing a pastorship on to one of the children of the retiring pastor, Oak named Rev. Oh Jung-hyun as the new pastor.

In 2007 SaRang extended its worldwide mission to Europe and the United Kingdom, announcing its sponsorship of the Wales Evangelical School of Theology.

In 2013, the church opened the largest underground church chapel, but it extended its underground area under a nearby public road.  The supreme court of Korea  ruled that the chapel made the area "socially, economically, and culturally limited in access ― unable to serve public purposes for nearby residents," according to a subsequent report.

Website
 Church Webpage in English

References

Christian organizations established in 1978
Presbyterian megachurches
Churches in Seoul
Presbyterian churches in Seoul